Lake Emily is a ghost town in the town of Amherst, Portage County, Wisconsin, United States. Lake Emily Park, located just west of Amherst Junction, Wisconsin is one of 24 areas managed by the Portage County Parks Department.

Notes

Geography of Portage County, Wisconsin
Ghost towns in Wisconsin